The Sakis Rouvas Collection is a ready-to-wear fashion brand headed by Greek entertainer Sakis Rouvas.  This was launched exclusively to Greece's largest department store franchise, Sprider Store, in 2010, which made Rouvas the first Greek artist to have his own fashion line.

History and premise

Sakis Rouvas had long been considered a fashion and stylistic icon in Greece.  He was known for having several trademark looks, such as various jackets, leather pants, and aviator sunglasses. He received accolades such as Celebrity with Best Personal Style from MAD TV, one of the two musicians awarded for fashion, as well as Best Dressed Artist in a Video in 2006 and Fashion Icon of the Year in 2010 at the MAD Video Music Awards. He has been cited as influencing fashion among musicians and many other artists have been cited to imitate his personal style. Rouvas has been the first Greek artist to market themselves through merchandise, and with the launch of the Sakis Rouvas Collection he became the first Greek artist to have his own fashion label. It further expanded the entrepreneurial image Rouvas had established for himself within the period of 2009–2010, having launched business ventures such as a restaurant, nightclub, beauty salon franchise, and film and television production company.

For the creation of his fashion label, Rouvas teamed up with several professional fashion designers and stylists to create the looks, while he also had creative input in the design department, choosing styles, giving his ideas on and approving designs. Rouvas' partner since 2003, supermodel Katia Zygouli, gave some input on the female designs. The premise of the brand is to exhibit Rouvas' own personal style and tastes, and is an attempt to mix high-end fashion with affordable prices that the majority of the public would be able to purchase. According to its publications, the brand's top priority is about the comfort of the wearer, as well as aesthetics, beauty, and elegance, and attention to detail. Rouvas summarized: "I wanted to create an entire collection that would express my aesthetics, to answer to the [financial] needs of the current times, without making discounts in quality and to be loved by the consumers who will find a distinct perception of fashion that everyone can interpret according to their own style and persona."

Marketing
Rumours of Rouvas beginning his own fashion label began in 2010; at the MAD Video Music Awards 2010, where Rouvas won Fashion Icon of the Year, fashion designer and stylist Lakis Gavalas, who presented the award to him, hinted at the label's launch by asking the entertainer his thoughts about launching one. The label is exclusively available at Greek department store retailer Sprider Store, Greece's largest multinational department store franchise. Rouvas officially announced the label's launch at the 27 July Corinth stop of his 2010 summer tour. The line was inaugurated on 16 September at the Vogue Fashion's Night Out at the Sprider Store on Ermou Street 54 in downtown Athens. 

The brand caters equally to both sexes and is marketed towards a contemporary young adult market. The logo is Rouvas' signature, part of his Sakis Rouvas franchise brand, which includes ownership to other merchandise such as a line of dolls and music recording masters.

On 26 July the official teaser for the brand was released, featuring Rouvas in a design room, approving designs and trying on the clothing. Rouvas discussed the label on the premiere of Vrady Me Ton Petro Kostopoulo on 6 October, where he joked that the reason why he decided to create it was because "he had no more clothing as he is constantly ripping his at concerts". In October 2010, a television commercial for the line was released.

Reception
Madata praised Rouvas' marketing innovation saying that he "demonstrated again that he is the one and only superstar in the country and a role model for many young people" as well as adding that "[f]urthermore, he has nothing to be envious of foreign stars who put their signatures on perfumes, clothing, accessories, and anything else you can imagine". Anny Tzotzadini of Greek reporter believed that it would change the standards of marketing in Greece.

Notes

External links
Official site

Clothing brands
Sakis Rouvas